Jürgen Melzer was the defending champion, but lost to qualifier David Goffin in the first round.

Lukáš Rosol won the title, defeating Jerzy Janowicz in the final, 3–6, 7–6(7–3), 7–5, en route saving 2 match points in the third set.

Seeds
All seeds received a bye into the second round.

Draw

Finals

Top half

Section 1

Section 2

Bottom half

Section 3

Section 4

Qualifying

Seeds
The top five seeds received a bye into second round.

Qualifiers

Qualifying draw

First qualifier

Second qualifier

Third qualifier

Fourth qualifier

References
Main Draw
Qualifying Draw

Winston-Salem Open - Singles
2014 Singles